Machell is a surname. Notable people with the surname include:

Charlie Machell (born 1994), English footballer
James Octavius Machell (1837–1902), British racehorse trainer
John Machell (1637–1704), English politician

See also
Machel